John Arthur (September 22, 1946 – January 22, 2007) was an American professor of philosophy and an expert in legal theory, constitutional theory, social ethics, and political philosophy.  He taught at Binghamton University for 18 years.

Early life and education 

John Arthur, son of L. James Arthur and Elizabeth Gleason Arthur, grew up in Denver, Colorado.  Arthur earned his bachelor's degree in philosophy and history at Cornell College and his master's degree in political sociology and PhD in philosophy at Vanderbilt University.

Academic career 

In total, John Arthur spent time teaching at five colleges and universities, including Brandeis University, Harvard University, Tennessee State University, the College of Charleston and Lake Forest College.

From 1981–1988 Arthur taught at Tennessee State University. Finding the segregated conditions at TSU to be in violation of the Equal Protection Clause of the United States Constitution, he organized a biracial group to file suit against the State of Tennessee.  The resulting settlement included a desegregation plan for the entire post-secondary education system of Tennessee and brought in millions of dollars to improve Tennessee State University. In 1989, soon after leaving Tennessee State University, Arthur published his first book, The Unfinished Constitution: Philosophy and Constitutional Practice. Arthur served as a fellow in law and philosophy at Harvard Law School from 1986–1988.

In 1988, Arthur became a professor of philosophy at Binghamton University, where he worked for 18 years.  He created an interdisciplinary academic major for Binghamton undergraduate students called the "Program in Philosophy, Politics, and Law", of which Arthur was the director.  He received the University and Chancellor's Awards for Excellence in Teaching in 1992.  In 1995, Arthur served as a research fellow at the University of St Andrews' Centre for Philosophy and Public Affairs, and from 2002–2003 he was a fellow in law and philosophy at the University of Oxford.

Personal life 
In 1990, John Arthur married consumer protection lawyer Amy Shapiro in Denver, Colorado.  Arthur's previous marriage had ended in divorce.

John Arthur died in hospice care at Lourdes Hospital in Binghamton, New York on the morning of January 22, 2007 after a year-long battle with lung cancer. He was buried in Denver, Colorado and was survived by his wife.

Selected works 
John Arthur wrote three books, the last of which was published posthumously.
 
 
 

Arthur also co-edited and co-authored several books, including:

References

External links 
 Program in Philosophy, Politics, and Law at Binghamton University

1946 births
2007 deaths
Writers from Denver
Writers from Nashville, Tennessee
Writers from Binghamton, New York
Tennessee State University faculty
Binghamton University faculty
Cornell College alumni
Vanderbilt University alumni
Philosophers from New York (state)
Philosophers from Tennessee
Philosophers from Colorado
American ethicists
Writers from New York (state)
20th-century American philosophers
21st-century American philosophers
20th-century American educators
21st-century American educators
20th-century American male writers
21st-century American male writers
21st-century American non-fiction writers
20th-century American non-fiction writers